Regulation (EU) 2022/1925, commonly referred to as the Digital Markets Act (DMA), is an EU regulation that aims to make the digital economy fairer and more contestable. The regulation proposed by the European Commission in December 2020 was signed into law by the European Parliament and the Council of the EU in September 2022. It entered into force on 1 November 2022 and will become applicable, for the most part, on 2 May 2023. After this, the gatekeepers will be identified and they will have to comply by 6 March 2024 at the latest.

The DMA intends to ensure a higher degree of competition in the European Digital Markets, by preventing large companies from abusing their market power and by allowing new players to enter the market. Once implemented, it will establish a list of obligations for designated Gatekeepers and in case of non-compliance, there will be enforced sanctions mechanisms, including fines of up to 10% of the worldwide turnover.

This regulation targets the largest digital platforms operating in the European Union. They are also known as "Gatekeepers" due to the "durable" market position in some digital sectors and because they also meet certain criteria related to the number of users, their turnovers, or capitalisation. Even if the list of Gatekeepers has not been released yet, "Big Tech" (Alphabet, Amazon, Meta, Apple, Microsoft) are likely to be the main subjects of the act, but not the only ones.

The list of obligations would include prohibitions on combining data collected from two different services belonging to the same company (e.g. Facebook and WhatsApp); provisions for the protection of platforms' business users (including advertisers and publishers); legal instruments against the self-preferencing methods used by platforms for promoting their own products (preferential results for Google's products when using Google Search); articles concerning the pre-installation of some services (Android); regulation related to bundling practices; provisions for ensuring interoperability, portability, and access to data for businesses and end-users of platforms.

According to the European Commission, the main objective of this regulation is to regulate the behaviour of the Big Tech firms within the European Single Market and beyond. The Commission aims to guarantee a fair level of competition ("level playing field") on the highly concentrated digital European markets, which are often characterised by a "winner takes all" configuration.

The DMA covers eight different sectors and they are also known as Core Platforms Services (CPS). Due to the presence of Gatekeepers who, to a certain degree, affect the market contestability, the CPS are considered problematic by the European Commission: 
 online search engines (e.g. Google Search); 
 online intermediation services (e.g. Google Play Store, Apple's App Store); 
 social networks (e.g. Facebook); 
 video sharing platforms (e.g. YouTube); 
 communication platforms (e.g. WhatsApp, Gmail); 
 advertising services (e.g. Google Ads); 
 operating systems (e.g. Android, iOS); 
 cloud services (e.g. Amazon Web Services).

Historical background 
The present rules applied within the European Union with regard to digital markets are derived from European and national legislation. Under these circumstances, the basis for competition rules in the EU is established by Articles 101 and 102 of the Treaty on the Functioning of the European Union (TFEU). Article 101 addresses anti-competitive agreements and concerted practices that may affect trade between members states or reduce competition in the common market. Article 102 aims to tackle the abuse of dominant positions. All players operating in the common market are therefore subject to these provisions. European and national authorities have identified the need to strengthen the current legislation, given the structural problems that are not covered. In addition, the case law of the CJEU is also an important aspect that should be mentioned, given its dynamic nature and the clarifications brought through the latest rulings.

The Digital Markets Act is in line with the legislative developments undertaken by the Junker Commission between 2014 and 2019. During his mandate, there have been implemented 28 legislative proposals on the Digital Single Market, covering the following areas: Digital Culture, Digital Future, Digital Life, Digital Trust, Digital Shopping, and Digital Connectivity. These proposals were put forward with the scope to adapt the European legislation to the current challenges, while ensuring the free movement of persons and capital. These legislative developments contribute to the enforcement of long-term strategies in the European digital sector. For example, these modifications have led to the implementation of 35 new measures designated to boost connectivity, the data economy and digital public services, and they also aim to enhance digital rights in an integrated manner.

One of the most important pieces of EU digital legislation is represented by the EU copyright rules. This has led to the protection, payment, and recognition of workers in thirty-three sectors and it aims to reward creativity, stimulate investment in the creative sector. Another relevant achievement can be considered the implementation of the General Data Protection Regulation (GDPR) in 2016. This regulation sets out the new European framework for the use and circulation of personal data and has a significant impact on the major digital players. In addition, the regulation on platform-to-business trading practices (P2B) has been established to create a fair, transparent and predictable business environment for smaller businesses and traders on online platforms. This regulation has applied in July 2020 and prevents market distortion, encourages healthy competition and prohibits unfair practices.

Legislative procedure 
The Digital Markets Act proposal was submitted by the European Commission to the European Parliament and to the Council of the European Union on 15 December 2020. Along with the Digital Services Act (DSA), the DMA is part of the Commission's European Digital Strategy entitled Shaping Europe's Digital Future. The proposals were presented by the Executive Vice President of the European Commission for A Europe Fit for the Digital Age, Margrethe Vestager, and by the European Commissioner for Internal Market, Thierry Breton, as members of the Von der Leyen Commission.

On 23 November 2021, the Parliament's Committee on the Internal Market and Consumer Protection (IMCO) adopted its position on the DMA proposal, and the text was adopted in plenary session of the European Parliament on 15 December 2021. The approved text became the Parliament's mandate for negotiations with the Council, which started under the French presidency of the Council in the first half of 2022. On 25 November 2021, the Council agreed its negotiating position, providing the Presidency with a mandate for the discussions.

On 24 March 2022, the Parliament and the Council meeting in the trilogue format together with the Commission reached a political agreement on the DMA. The negotiators reached a consensus on the interoperability provisions for large messaging platforms: the said obligations will make it possible for users to communicate between different platforms, giving them more choice against the increasing dominance of certain companies. The choice is expanded also through provisions that guarantee users’ free choice as regards browsers, virtual assistants or search engines, while no interoperability obligation for social networks has been decided upon yet. In the political agreement, platforms with a market capitalization of €75 billion or turnover in the European Economic Area equal to or above €7.5 billion have been included in the rules’ scope. An agreement was reached for penalties, which will be amounting from 10% of annual worldwide turnover due to non-compliance for first infringements up to 20% in the case of repeated infringements. The text of the DMA provisionally agreed in March 2022 was made publicly available by the European institutions only on 22 May 2022.

The DMA was formally adopted by the Parliament on 5 July 2022 and by the Council on 19 July 2022, and it was signed into law on 14 September 2022 by Presidents of the Parliament and the Council, which concluded the legislative procedure. The adopted text was published in the Official Journal of the European Union on 12 October 2022, setting it to come into force twenty days after the publication, on 1 November 2022. 

The 2 May 2023, 6 months later, the regulation will start to applying and the potential gatekeepers will have 2 months to report to the commision to be identified as gatekeepers. This process will take up to 45 days and after being identified as gatekeepers, they will have 6 months to come into compliance, at the latest the 6 March 2024.

Objective of the DMA 

The DMA specifically targets Big Tech companies.
The DMA proposed to classify certain platforms, according to their number of users, capitalisation, market power or turnover, probably including Apple, Google, Facebook and Amazon as "Gatekeepers" making them subject to new obligations.  
It aims at preventing large companies from abusing their market power and to allow smaller and new players to enter the market.

Rationale 

In December 2020, the European Commission released a legislative proposal that intends to protect consumer welfare and to restore a level playing field in the European Union's digital market. At the moment, the economy is being driven to a large extent by the activities conducted through online platforms. A small number of online platforms have come to play a crucial role in the lives of millions of individuals and companies. They intermediate a significant portion of transactions between consumers and businesses, leading to extreme dependencies of many businesses on these important platforms.

In the table below, it can be observed that EU digital markets face a high level of concentration, with companies such as Google or Facebook controlling almost the entirety of a specific market segment. In the past, some examples have shown that innovation can, at times, reshuffle market power and facilitate the entry for potential competitors. For instance, Facebook replaced MySpace, Google outcompeted AltaVista, and MSN Messenger was overtaken as the main communication platform used on the internet. However, while the dominant position of MySpace or of AltaVista have only lasted for a few years, it seems that Google or Facebook managed to entrench their dominant position in time. In the digital economy jargon, these companies are defined as digital intermediation platforms and are at the core of online economic activities. Thus, platforms link and facilitate interactions between economic agents’ groups from different sides of the markets (typically consumers or end-users with business-users). 

As acknowledged by Alexandre de Streel, professor of European law at the University of Namur and specialist in EU competition law, some digital platforms, the GAFAM in particular, may also have a gatekeeper function. The term gatekeeper refers to the ability of intermediary platforms to act as the main "bottleneck" to a large number of market participants, that are not reachable elsewhere. Behind this development are market forces that encompass (1) important economies of scale on the supply side; (2) strong direct and indirect network effects on the demand-side; (3) data-driven competitive advantage; (4) high rate of innovation; and (5) development of conglomerates that structure entire ecosystems. In addition, the combination of these elements can lead to market dynamics that follow the "winner-takes-most" scenarios.

By way of illustration, there can be considered a hypothetical market for mobile operating systems (OS), formed by one large OS (in terms of consumer base) and a smaller one. Following the assumption according to which the higher the number of persons using a particular OS, the more attractive this OS will be for app developers, under these circumstances, the largest OS may benefit from stronger indirect network effects. Thus, developers will tend to favour the largest OS for their apps because this enables them to reach a larger customer base and a bigger market. Due to these factors, the benefits gap provided by the larger OS and its smaller counterparts, respectively, is expected to grow in time. Moreover, the large OS will gather and process more data than its competitors, aspect that will support the improvement of quality. In parallel, the small OS will become less attractive to both customers and app developers, until it possibly vanishes from the market and the largest OS takes all. According to Joe Belfiore, the current Corporate Vice President in the Experiences and Devices division of Microsoft, one of the reasons that Microsoft decided to leave the mobile market was its inability to attract enough app makers for its operating system.

During the last years, serious concerns have been expressed by authorities across the world with regard to the economic power of some digital giants. In Europe, the European Commission – backed by years of enforcement experience in EU competition law – has pointed out that a part of those intermediary platforms may be considered "Gatekeeper" or "structuring platforms" in their respective market segments. Moreover, it has also expressed the concern that Big Tech companies might unlawfully take advantage of their market and bargaining powers, in order to lock in dominant positions (i.e. in the existing markets), to increase their level of influence, and to obtain leading positions in new sectors of activity. Hence, this can be interpreted as providing unfair advantages to the incumbents present in core and ancillary services, as distorting the competition, and as harming the consumers, in the long run, through either increased prices or reduced options. Under EU competition law, reaching a "dominant position" is by no mean considered illegal, nor is the idea of a "winner takes most" scenario. However, practices that lock in dominant positions or that impose unfair conditions, terms to third parties might be treated as unlawful.

It should be mentioned that the economics behind this approach are not always straightforward, taking into account that the effects generated by a company's behaviour often lead, at the same time, to pro and anti-competitive results. If one specific digital platform decides to extend from its core market, where it holds a dominant position, to another related market by offering a wider range of products or services to its consumers, this might be viewed as an example of bundling. In Microsoft's case, given the bundling of Teams with the cloud-based Office software, every user of Microsoft Office software can freely enjoy the Microsoft Teams application. On the one hand, this development is able to deliver benefits for consumers, because it usually increases the synergies between different products provided by a common operator. On the other hand, the same practice can also lead to the exclusion of efficient niche competitors, and affect the efficient providers of complementary products or prevent potential competitors from entering the market, consequently foreclosing the market for the benefit of Microsoft's growth.

Therefore, the economic impact generated by gatekeepers' behaviour can be interpreted under the form of trade-offs, taking into account that their selection depends on various sets of values, rights and interests. An example for the abovementioned trade-off trend can be considered the relation between short term competition versus long term competition. Thus, if we reiterate the previous bundling practice of Microsoft, we can infer that in the short term, consumer welfare may increase (short term competition), but at the same time, it can also be detrimental to consumers in the long run, due to reduced competition and the lack of incentives for Microsoft to further innovate. In addition, another possible trade-off might be derived from the linkage between competition and innovation. While the acquisition of a start-up by a gatekeeper may contribute to the development and/or to the diffusion of the underlying innovation brought by the former, this may be detrimental to the consumers in the long run.

The Proposal on the Digital Markets Act has the aim to increase digital markets' contestability and to ensure a significant level of fairness. By establishing these clear-cut objectives, the European Commission seeks to foster innovation by promoting new entrants' activities and development over incumbents. On the one hand, the DMA intends to constrain gatekeepers’ range of action, but at the same time it also forces the incumbents to open to competition.

Criteria defining Gatekeepers 
Given the fact that EU competition law can be applied only when anti-competitive practices have been enforced, in the literature was initiated a large debate with regard to the ex-ante regulation. Once the utility and efficiency of the existing tools began to be questioned, the policy discussions held before the release of the Digital Markets Act focused on the identification of Gatekeepers, on setting obligations, and on potential conducts that should be outlawed for Gatekeepers.

Following the same line, scholars came to the conclusion that large online platforms "operate as digital Gatekeepers between businesses and citizens". At the moment there is not established a clear definition for this term, but it can be mentioned that it usually refers to "platforms providing online services (e.g. online marketplaces) or controlling and influencing access to online services ... thereby exercising control over entire ecosystems, with a strong impact on competition and innovation in the digital field".

Under these circumstances, right before the adoption of the Digital Services Act, the commission made public its intention to regulate large online platforms for better ensuring that markets influenced by these actors remain fair and competitive. Thus, the European executive aimed to implement an "ex-ante regulatory instrument", through the Digital Markets Act (DMA), for tackling the limitations imposed by its current competition rules.

For classifying platforms as digital Gatekeepers, a combination of quantitative and qualitative conditions is required. On the one hand, quantitative criteria include indicators for "market shares, number of users affected by platform operations, time users spent on a platform's website, and the platform's annual economic revenue". Thus, the following aspects are analysed:

"The undertaking to which the core platform service(s) belongs has an annual EEA turnover equal to or above EUR 6.5 billion in the last three financial years or has an average market capitalization of EUR 65 billion or higher and provides a core platform service in at least three Member States".
"It operates a core platform service that serves as an important gateway for business users to reach end-users. The criteria are supposed to be met when the core platform service has more than 45 million monthly active end users established or located in the Union and more than 10.000 yearly active business users established in the Union in the last financial year".
"It enjoys an entrenched and durable position in its operations, or it is foreseeable that it will enjoy such a position in the near future. Which translates by meeting the thresholds of point 2) in each of the last three financial years".

On the other hand, the qualitative criteria are harder to assess, but several variables can be taken into account, such as the ability of a platform to control access or to leverage its dominant position. While large platforms designed as search engines or marketplaces may be identified or referred to as digital Gatekeepers, it is not clear whether companies that have as subject other activities – travel or music – can be automatically included in the same category. However, even though the legislative proposal does not mention explicitly the undertakings that meet these thresholds, it is expected that the GAFAM will be subject to the DMA.

At the same time, it should be specified that through market investigation, even providers of core platform services – that cover solely a part of the concerned thresholds – may be identified as Gatekeepers by the commission. "In conducting its assessment, the Commission shall take into account foreseeable developments of these elements."

Given the importance and the innovative character of the DMA proposal, several stakeholders have engaged and proposed scenarios for applying a test with the purpose of identifying digital Gatekeepers. The UK Competition Market Authority came with the suggestion of implementing ex-ante rules for companies known to possess "strategic market status". Thus, they proposed three factors to be considered: the size and scale; ability to leverage their market power in other sectors of activity; to hold the position of access point both for consumers and businesses. Furthermore, the Centre on Regulation in Europe published a lengthier and in-depth analysis, according to which ex-ante regulation should be applied if online platforms comply with four cumulative criteria: large size; to occupy a position on which other businesses rely/depend; Gatekeeper position that lasts (due to high entry barriers); Gatekeeper having control over an ecosystem.

New "ex ante" regulations

General framework 
The Digital Markets Act sets up a list of conducts that should be outlawed, on the one hand, and obligations that platforms identified as Gatekeepers should respect, on the other hand. The list is divided in two different parts, the general blacklisted actions (Article 5) and the case by case assessment that needs to be specified (Article 6).

The different ways of defining obligations and prohibitions have raised several debates between scholars and stakeholders. Some experts support the approach focused on balancing anti-competitive effects with possible justifications, while others are in favour of banning specific practices from the beginning. De Streel classified the new obligations as concerning the following common areas:

 Transparency in ad intermediation
 Envelopment through bundling or self-preferencing access platforms and data
 End-users' and business users' mobility
 Limitation of unfair practices

Those practices are often derived from the past case-law and are considered unfair by the European Commission. Therefore, this proposal uses "ex-post" cases to create new "ex-ante" regulations and to tackle the issue from the roots.

Sectors concerned (Core Platforms Services) 
The DMA covers eight different sectors, also known as Core Platforms Services (CPS). The European Commission considers them problematic because the Gatekeepers' presence prevents market contestability to a certain extent. It is important to remember that the commission has not released yet the list of companies that will be identified as Gatekeepers and that all the firms mentioned in the following sections are only possible examples.

 Online search engines (e.g. Google Search)
 Online intermediation services (e.g. Google Play, App Store, Amazon Marketplace)
 Social networks (e.g. Facebook)
 Video sharing platforms (e.g. YouTube)
 Communication platforms (e.g. WhatsApp, Gmail)
 Operating systems (e.g. Google Android, iOS)
 Cloud services (e.g. Google Cloud Platform)
 Advertising services (e.g. Google Ads)

New obligations for identified Gatekeepers 

 It may prevent practices known as self-preferencing, applied by companies like Google for better displaying their products among the results of Google search.
 Gatekeeper companies could also be prohibited from reusing people's personal data. For example, Facebook could be forbidden from using the data obtained from its subsidiary WhatsApp.
 The proposal ensures rights to the platform's business users. For example, it could prohibit Apple from imposing a 30% commission on all the transactions concluded via App store.
 Gatekeepers platforms may also be prohibited from requiring business users to offer their best deals on the platform (for example Amazon required e-book publishers to apply their best conditions on the Amazon e-book marketplace).
 There are also device neutrality rules regarding the rights to delete pre-installed applications (as in the case of Apple iOS or Google Android for example) and to install apps from other sources.
 Protection rights for business users of platforms (including advertisers and publishers).
 Prohibition of some bundling practices.
 Provisions for ensuring a higher degree of data portability, interoperability, and access to data for the platform's business and end-users.
 Companies that do not comply with the new obligations may risk fines up to 10% on their worldwide turnover.

The two following sections detail each rule individually and mention, when it is the case, the concrete example that determined the commission to include them.

Forbidden actions 
This list comprises seven obligations and prohibitions for addressing the unfair trading practices. All the identified Gatekeepers will have to respect these provisions, independently from their sector of activity or their individual specificities. Moreover, enshrined in the Article 5 of the proposal, there are included general but also specific prohibitions to online platforms:

Combining personal data from different sources was ruled illegal by the German Federal Cartel Office in 2019, in a case against Facebook. The company was also fined €110 million in May 2017 for notifying the Commission that it would not be possible to combine data coming from Facebook and WhatsApp, at the time of the acquisition of WhatsApp in 2014. However, the Commission found that this practice constituted a possibility since 2014, given the fact that WhatsApp inserted this option in its terms of services privacy policy in 2016.

This has already been considered illegal in a competition law-case concerning Amazon e-books. In its contracts with the publishers of E-books, Amazon required them to offer at least the best price or conditions that they proposed to any other competitors. This article also derives from the cases concerning online travel agencies such as Booking.com or Expedia.

The legal character of this kind of practices is currently investigated by the European Commission in a case concerning the App Store of Apple and the 30% commission that they charged to all the subscriptions made through the App Store.

This is a general practice that does not come from the case law but it guarantees the right of business-users to raise possible concerns to public authorities (such as the European Commission).

Also known as a bundling practice, it prevents gatekeepers from forcing business users to use the ID of the Core Platform Services when they offer their services. Thus, it is often related to advertisers or publishers issues such as Google and their methods of collecting data.

For this bundling practice, in 2018, Google was fined with €4.3 billion by the Commission in a decision on Android. The company breached the antitrust rules of the EU by forcing Android's users to pre-install its own services, such as Google search and Google Chrome. This way, Google secured its dominant position in terms of internet search.

This last obligation is linked to the investigation of the European Commission on Google's data and advertising practices.

Case by case assessment 

The second part of the list comprises eleven obligations and prohibitions for gatekeepers enshrined in Article 6. After conducting a jointly assessment with the concerned Gatekeeper, the European Commission may specify individually the necessary obligations. The dialogue with the Gatekeeper has to respect the principle of effectiveness and proportionality, as stated in Article 7.5. Once again, most of the actions derive from former and current competition legal cases.

The potential ban of this practice derives from the Amazon Marketplace case that is under investigation by the European Commission. The Commission claimed that Amazon breached antitrust rules by using "non-public data" from their business users in order to compete with them.

This obligation derives from the cases on Microsoft Internet Explorer and Google Android, where the European Commission forced them to allow end-users to uninstall pre-installed app from their core platforms services.

The practice is currently investigated in the Apple App Store case. The Commission considers that Apple does not let its competitors inform users about the possibility to buy their products on other platforms than the App store, at potential cheaper prices.

This practice has already been prohibited in the case of Google Shopping and is currently investigated in the Amazon Buy Box case. Mainly, it refers to self-preferencing own products at the expense of competitors in the search results of a certain marketplace.

This can be seen as deriving from the conflict between Spotify and Apple on the restrictions imposed to use Spotify on Apple devices, that had the purpose of promoting Apple music services.

This provision derives from the practices currently analysed in the Apple Pay case. By favouring its devices and its own method of payment – Apple Pay – at the expense of its competitors, Apple is currently scrutinized by the commission.

This article would help business users of platforms, especially advertisers, to have access to the data related to the ads and publications posted on the Gatekeeper's platforms. Facebook and Google are potentially the main targets of this article, and maybe Amazon.

The abovementioned provision has a more general scope and it is not built around specific cases. Seen as complementing the GDPR regulation, it gives more precision regarding the scope of data portability, by adding that the data access should be "continuous" and "real time". In practical terms, this guarantees both access to users (including business-users) and benefits in terms of up-to-date data portability generated by the platform.

As article (h), this article does not derive from an individual case and complements the GDPR. It guarantees more rights to business and end-users regarding the interoperability of the data generated on platforms. This is meant to make data generated by different platforms compatible and usable by different systems.

This article is especially meant to ensure a higher degree of competition in the online search engines market, by providing more rights to the (new) competitors. It gives providers of online search engines access to data generated by the Gatekeeper in the sector (presumably Google Search at the moment, as it concentrates 95% of the market share in this sector). This is also related to the Google Search case and to Article 5(d) or the "blacklisted actions" of the DMA (see above).

This provision targets the store application of Gatekeepers (App Store, Google Play), and has the aim to protect the rights of app developers and of business-users.

Potential revolution for data portability 
Bjorn Lundqvist, in a paper published in February 2021, considers that the combination of the case by case obligations present in the Article 6 (a), (h) and (i) of the DMA, could be a real "game changer" regarding access to data. In addition, he highlights the fact that Art. 6 (a) prevents gatekeepers from using data generated by business-users, that are not publicly available, for competition reasons. At the same time, Art. 6 (h) and (i) guarantee rights to business-users and end-users with regard to access and portability of the data they have generated on the platform.

The author concludes by saying that the potential consequences should be clarified by the European Commission in order to know if this proposal will mark a major change in terms of access to data for business and end-users.

Other obligations for gatekeepers 

 Under Art. 12, Gatekeepers have to notify the Commission their intended future merger and acquisition.
 Under Art. 3, Gatekeepers have to notify the Commission when they meet the thresholds to be considered as gatekeepers (see above the section related to the criteria).
 Under Art. 13, when designated as gatekeepers, the firm has to conduct an independent audit about their profiling technique of consumers and submit it to the commission.

European Commission's investigation powers and sanctions mechanisms 
The Digital Markets Act will allow the European Commission to have regulatory and market investigation powers. Under these circumstances, market investigations will be mainly designated to:

 Conduct markets investigation so as to specify the obligations imposed on Gatekeepers and monitor compliance (Art. 16)
 Conduct markets investigation in order to designate gatekeepers (Art. 15)
 Conduct market investigations to identify new services and practices that can be subject to the obligations listed in Art. 5 and Art. 6 (Art. 17)
 Chapter V of the proposal gives the commission a certain number of rights in order to conduct these investigations
 Sanctions for gatekeepers in case of non-compliance or systematic non-compliance are represented by fines up to 10% of the Gatekeeper's worldwide turnover.

Relationship to national competition law enforcement 
Art. 1(5) of the Digital Markets Act states that Member States are prohibited from imposing on gatekeepers further obligations by way of laws, regulations or administrative action for the purpose of ensuring contestable and fair markets. Obligations that are unrelated to the relevant undertakings having a status of gatekeeper within the meaning of the Digital Markets Act are exempted from this prohibition.

On 22 March 2022, the European Court of Justice ruled in the joint cases C-117/20 Bpost and C-151/20 Nordzucker that investigators can start antitrust scrutiny of companies that have already been probed under sector regulation such as the Digital Markets Act, so long as the two cases are “conducted in a sufficiently coordinated manner within a proximate timeframe and the overall penalties imposed must correspond to the seriousness of the offenses committed.”

This opens up a path for parallel national prosecution of gatekeepers, for example as Germany has done under the German competition law amendment Section 19a. The German Federal Cartel Office has in 2021 opened multiple proceedings against large tech firms that would be considered gatekeepers under the Digital Markets Act, including Facebook (now: Meta), Amazon, Apple and Google. Section 19a cases may involve coordination among the German Federal Cartel Office and the European Commission and other national competition authorities. Legally, it has been proposed by the Federal Cartel Office that Section 19a must be seen as an expansion of competition law, meaning that it could be applied parallel to the Digital Markets Act. The trilogue negotiations on the Digital Markets Act have not yielded a common position on the matter.

Stakeholders' interests

Potential Gatekeepers

Google 
The tensions between Google and the European Union have been generated by sanctions applied to unfair practices related to advertising, mobile operating system, or shopping strategies. Several fines were imposed by the European Commission to Google because of breaches of competition law but taking into account that despite the CJEU's rulings, "inefficient market outcomes in terms of higher prices, lower quality, less choice and innovation" still emerged, the DMA aims to better regulate this area.

As the main focus of the Digital Markets Act is represented by operators that provide search engines, social networks, cloud computing services and operating systems, Google was one of the companies that officially presented its position. In an interview, Google's President of Business and Operations for the EMEA region Matt Brittin stated that: "It's so important to get the rules right for European consumers to have more choice, to support the kind of jobs we'll need in the future and to support European businesses."”

Even though not specifically named, Google is one of the companies that will be affected by the stringent rules, because the legislation will be applied to firms with European revenues of at least €6.5 bn or at least 45 million users across Europe. Nevertheless, as subject to potential fines of up to 10% of its global revenue for breaking the rules, Google is highly incentivized to continue influencing the legislators and lobbying in Brussels for obtaining better conditions under the Digital Market Act.

The rhetoric of Google and its attempts to contour an official position relied mainly on the risks that might emerge from the legislative act, namely barriers – "as Europeans will only have access to less choice and to more costly alternatives". Nevertheless, the big tech has also tried to highlight the weaknesses of the Digital Market Act and they labelled it a blacklist – whose implications in terms of interoperability might not generate innovation in the future, but incentives for "lowest common denominator".

In November 2020, the French news magazine Le Point published Google's leaked lobby strategy on the Digital Market Act, thus several practices and intentions have been uncovered. For example, there were made references to:

As far as the cost of these lobbying practices is concerned, according to the Transparency Register, Google spent more than €19 million euros on lobbying in the first half of 2020. Even though the sum of money allocated by Google has already reached significant levels, the numbers presented above do not comprise all the transactions related to academic partnerships, law firms, or activities conducted in individual Member States.

Corporate Europe Observatory investigated the fight of EU tech regulation and according to its findings, 158 meetings were registered since the Von der Leyen Commission took office, meetings that "involved 103 organisations, mostly companies and lobby groups. Only 13 actors had at least 3 or more meetings logged on these issues. Google stands out with the most meetings with Microsoft and Facebook trailing close behind. Apple and Amazon have also lobbied on the DMA and/ or DSA, although they rank lower overall with two and one meeting respectively". However, one of the limitations faced is represented by the fact that the endeavours with the officials responsible for drafting the legislation are not mentioned, as only the official meetings with high representatives are declared or announced.

Despite the fact that the proposal has been published on 15 December 2020, the lobbying practices still represent an ongoing process because they have been transferred from the commission to the European Parliament and Council. However, comparing the data obtained on the meetings of the European Commission with the information made available by the other institutions, it can be observed that transparency is even less stringent.

Apple 
The new European draft legislation has also targeted Apple's App Store with regard to its practices and preinstalled applications. One of the main changes that will be brought to their current business model is represented by the removal of the "self-preferencing" strategy. As a result of the proposal on the Digital Markets Act, Apple would be forced to change the manner in which its apps are displayed in the App Store searches, so as to give the chance to smaller developers to have their software downloaded by consumers. Moreover, Apple will have to allow its customers to uninstall preloaded first-party apps from the devices procured. Thus, both Google and Apple will be constrained and their practices more regulated. According to the DMA final proposal, these big tech companies will be compelled to share performance metrics for free with advertisers and publishers.

Before the official release of the DMA proposal, some companies – including Apple – tried to change their anti-competitive behaviour, taking into account the reactions generated by the commission's intent to regulate the digital market. For example, one of their requirements was related to the economic dependence on Apple – "Content publishers are in a situation of absolute economic dependence on Apple for the distribution of their content on the iPhone, since the only store available on this device is the AppStore". In addition, Apple was criticised for the 30% commission on sales that it makes through apps on the platform, thus the APIG showed its concern vis a vis the further concentration on the market. The reaction of Apple to these allegations was focused especially on a reduction of its commission rate to 15% for app developers with less than $1 million in annual net sales, but this did not impede the European Commission to continue advocating for the Digital Markets Act.

Similar to Google's case, Apple also seeks to limit the influence of the commission and to escape the definition of gatekeeper, so as not to become subject to further obligations. However, as Brussels still wants to outlaw gatekeepers' ability to ban others from accessing their marketplaces, firms like Spotify and Facebook – that believe Apple has set unfair conditions on those companies' apps within App Store, seem to support the commission's proposal.

The strategy of Apple to limit the influence of the DMA is not as clear or well-structured as in Google's case. However, there can be observed some practices engaged in by the company to ensure that its objectives are taken into account by the European officials. According to a research conducted by the Corporate Europe Observatory, it seems that Apple, Google, and Facebook used to work with several associations that declared themselves independent, without disclosing their linkages. For example, the Center for European Reform has featured on its website a list of its corporate donors – one of them being Apple – but Apple does not specify this information on the Transparency Register entry. Under these circumstances, it can be observed the network created around interests' groups, companies, NGOs and think tanks, as all of them seek to shape the legislative process in Brussels in their favour.

When it comes to lobby spending, despite the limited and incomplete information, it can be observed that Apple is in the top 30 individual corporate lobby spenders in Brussels, at numbers 16 (with over €2 million). In comparison with Google, that has allocated a budget of €8 million, Apple still invests a considerable sum of money on access to European officials, so as to present its demands.

Meta 
Considering that the Digital Markets Act aims to limit the influence of large companies by allowing alternative players to emerge, Meta has also been targeted by the legislative proposal. As in the other companies' cases, once the DMA is adopted, unfair practices will be highly discouraged and even prohibited, so as to stop the harm they bring to competition.

However, apart from Google, Apple, and Amazon, Meta seems to support the EU rules that have been published last year. In its official declarations, Meta claimed that it hopes that the European Union will set boundaries for Apple. Nevertheless, in this context there were not observed solely tensions between the Commission and the Big Tech companies, but even between GAFAM, taking into account their statements and the objectives they advocate for.

The controversies between Meta and Apple started with the privacy feature used by Apple, that allows consumers to block advertisers from tracking them across different applications. Thus, Meta, a company that earns revenue from advertising, began to retaliate and showed its discontent. It has also added that "Apple controls an entire ecosystem from device to app store and apps, and uses this power to harm developers and consumers, as well as large platforms like Facebook". The reaction of Apple was quite harsh and accused Meta of "invasive tracking". Therefore, the discussions around the Digital Markets Act started to create more tensions between Big Tech firms and to deviate from the scope of the proposal, as the companies focused on criticising their "competitors" of illegal practices.

Amazon
Amazon welcomed the DMA and according to its position, the company has not been as concerned about it as the other GAFAM members. This can be explained by the fact that compared to Google's and Apple's case, the Digital Markets Act could affect Amazon only in three aspects:

 Amazon might be obliged to allow business users to offer the same products or services to end-users at prices or conditions that are different from those offered by Amazon (DMA Article 5b)
 Amazon might be obliged not to use data from competitors that is not public (DMA Article 6a)
 Amazon might be obliged not to treat the services and the products it offers more favourably (DMA Article 6d)

The prohibition on using non-public data from competitors it hosts on its platform and the prohibition on ranking its product before the ones offered by competitors may impact Amazon if the proposal for the DMA is adopted under its current form. Moreover, these aspects caused Amazon to negotiate the final version of the regulation, taking into account that it spent €1.75 million on lobbying practices and that it became a member of several think tanks.

Microsoft
Compared to other Big Tech firms, Microsoft is the most discreet, as it does not use media or newspapers to express its opinion on the Digital Markets Act. The only thing done in a public manner by Microsoft was to react to the commission's consultations. They suggested that the qualification of platforms as gatekeepers might be determined by using a two-pronged test. On the one hand, it should be assessed the level of market power protected by significant barriers to entry. On the other hand, a specific EU regulatory body for the enforcement of ex-ante regulation should be implemented. Moreover, according to Caffara & Morton, the only obligation that might affect Microsoft under the DMA is to allow end-users to delete any software applications pre-installed.

Non-Gatekeeper firms

A narrow definition of gatekeeper 
Before the release of the proposal, there was a debate related to the criteria needed for designating a company as gatekeeper. On a more general note, one of the most important indicators would be considered the number of firms impacted by the DMA. As this narrow definition for gatekeepers has been applied by the European Commission, only a few firms (especially the American 'Big Tech' or GAFAM) are likely to be targeted by the concerned legislation.

Airbnb and Booking.com 
Due to their important positions on the short-term accommodation market, AirBnB and Booking.com became potential targets for the legislation. Indeed, above 50% of the homes designated for ‘short-terms stay’ are listed on AirBnB, and approximatively  on Booking.com. Therefore, their possible labelling as gatekeepers has been long debated, leading the companies to defend themselves and explain why they should not be considered included in this category. Moreover, Booking.com insisted on the fact that it is one of the only European companies that is a global success and that as they are not the most dominant actor in this sector, they should not be disincentivized while competing with bigger companies.

Spotify 
With approximatively  of the market share in 2020 in the music subscription market, Spotify is by far the dominant actor in this sector as Apple music comes in second position, with around 15% of market share. However, Spotify does not seem to meet the criteria set by the European Commission, according to the analysis of Vox EU. Dirk Auer, an economist of the American think tank ICLE, qualified this piece of legislation as a way to protect the European firms, and that the criteria are on purpose excluding major European tech firms, notably Spotify. Even if it is true that SAP would probably be the only European firm targeted by the legal act, there are also American big platforms like Twitter or Uber not targeted by the legislation, despite their important market position.

Reaction within the European Union

France 
The French Government expressed its ambition for imposing stricter enforcement on competition rules, so as to prevent giant tech firms favouring their own services, ousting rivals or maintaining their dominant positions.

Nevertheless, France would like to rely on the possibility of adapting the rules, through the Digital Markets Act, in order to respond to the constant changes of the digital market.  

The French government is known to be publicly in favour of more regulation of the GAFAM and unilaterally set up its "GAFA tax" in 2019. This tax was the source of tensions with the Trump administration.

Germany   
The German federal government welcomed the proposal on the Digital Markets Act. They consider that the current European legal framework is not sufficiently strong and that the enforcement measures must also be strengthened with respect to digital platforms. However, the main concern of Germany still remains the preservation of small and medium-sized companies, as it intends to keep them out of the scope of the new rules.

The head of the German Federal Cartel Office, Andreas Mundt, has on several occasions criticised the European Commission's centralised approach to regulating gatekeepers. He has called the European Commission's veto right over national competition authorities’ powers to impose decisions against Big Tech "unacceptable", and has asked for more powers to be given to national competition authorities. This position was echoed by other Member States.

Netherlands 
In October 2020, the Dutch Government jointly with France and Belgium, expressed their willingness for a stricter enforcement of the competition rules, in order to avoid abuse of dominance and anti-competitive practices.

On 17 February 2021, the Dutch Government published its official position on the Digital Markets Act and welcomed the initiative, taking into account that the objectives it comprises are aligned with their national position.

Ireland 
The Irish government published its position on 8 September 2020, during the public consultations held for the Digital Services Act Package. According to their statements, Irish authorities are not willing to assess the definition of "gatekeepers", as they explained that the occupation of a dominant position is not illegal. Moreover, they have also stressed that this particular aspect does not imply a diminution of consumer welfare and does not prevent innovation or new entrances in the digital market.

Many of the companies that are likely to be targeted by the DMA have their headquarters in Ireland. The approach of the Irish Government towards Big Tech companies has often been the source of debates within the European Union. In 2016, the European Commission accused Ireland of granting Apple "illegal tax benefits". The General Court ruled in favour of Apple, but the Commission expressed its intention to appeal the ruling to the European Court of Justice.

Rest of the world's position

United States 

Even though they are not mentioned explicitly in the proposal released by the European Commission, it is more than likely that the American "Big Tech" (Google, Amazon, Facebook, Apple, Microsoft), as well as Booking.com are expected to be the main targets of this new legislation.

This legislation comes in a context where the EU and the US, under the Biden administration, want to rebuild a better relation after the tensions that emerged during the Trump presidency. The European Commission has stressed the need for cooperation between the EU and US to deal with the dominant position of online platforms and big tech that they consider harmful. 
In January 2021, the President of the European Commission, Ursula von Der Leyen, stated that the current president of the United States, Joe Biden, and the European Union share the same position regarding the regulation of tech companies. In a speech at the Munich Security Conference in February 2021, she invited the United States  to join the European Unions in their initiatives in order to create rules in the digital Economy that can be "valid worldwide".

Even if the official position of the Biden administration on the Digital Markets Act is not yet publicly known, the same debates about the dominant position of some digital tech platforms are rising in the United States. An antitrust lawsuit was opened in December 2020 against Facebook by the US Federal Trade Commission and 46 American states for abusing its dominant position and exercising anti-competitive conduct for several years.

In a document published in March 2021, the Congressional Research Service, an American government think tank that informs the members of the US Congress, outlined the fact that the new digital regulations led by the European Union, including the Digital Markets Act, could be sources of potential future cooperation between the EU and the United States, while stressing the potential impact on the US economy.

References

External links
 European Commission: The Digital Markets Act
 Regulation (EU) 2022/1925 of 14 September 2022 on contestable and fair markets in the digital sector on EUR-Lex
 Procedure 2020/0374(COD) on ŒIL

European Union regulations
Policies of the European Union
European Digital Strategy
2022 in law
2022 in the European Union
E-commerce in the European Union